Ayandeh Bank is a bank in the Islamic Republic of Iran. It was established in 2013. The bank is a member of the Islamic Association of Iran.

History
Ayandeh Bank was established on August 7, 2013 with the registration No. 442325 following the merger of two credit institutions and a bank. It started to work as a private bank under the supervision of the Central Bank of the Islamic Republic of Iran with the license No. 93/349144 dated March 17, 2015.

In August 2018, the Ayandeh Bank was on the list of sanctioned individuals and companies from Iran.

In December 2020, the bank announced the sale of the Iran Mall for $3.5 Billion in a move to divest its non-banking assets.

Affiliated companies  
 Sanjesh Omid Ayandeh, Investment Consulting and Financial Services Company
 Ertebat Farda, Electronic Commerce Company
 Ayandeh Bank Brokerage Company

Financial data

See also

 Banking in Iran
 Privatization in Iran

References

External links
Official website

Banks of Iran
Banks established in 2009
Iranian companies established in 2009
Iranian entities subject to the U.S. Department of the Treasury sanctions